Amália a l'Olympia is a live album recorded by Amália Rodrigues and released on the Columbia label (FSX 123). It was recorded live at l'Olympia in Paris and released in 1956. She was accompanied on Portuguese guitar by Domingos Camarinha and on viola by Santos Moreira.

The 1956 concert at the Olympia began a long history of Amália recording at the venue. Her Paris recordings were collected in 2020 on a five-disc box set.

In a review of the album, Stephen Cook of Allmusic.com wrote: "Rodrigues can be heard here in optimal environs, with just the sound of her passionate voice, a fado guitar duo, and hundreds of adoring fans. A highlight of the Rodrigues catalog."

The album was later reissued on compact disc under various titles, including At the Olympia Theatre and Live at the Paris Olympia 1956.

Track listing
Side A
 Uma Casa Portuguesa	
 Nem Às Paredes Confesso	
 Ai Mouraria	
 Perseguição	
 Tudo Isto É Fado	
 Fado Corrido	
 Barco Negro

Side B
 Coimbra	
 Sabe-Se Lá	
 A Tendinha	
 Lá Vai Lisboa	
 Que Deus Me Perdoe	
 Lisboa Antiga	
 Amália

References

1956 albums
Amália Rodrigues albums